Baldwin (II) from the kindred Rátót (died after 1283) was a Hungarian distinguished nobleman from the gens Rátót as the son of Baldwin I Rátót, who served as ispán (comes) of Zala County from 1275 to 1276 and in 1276.

His older brother was Julius II Rátót. Baldwin's only son, Lawrence was the ancestor of the Rátóti and Gyulaffy de Rátót noble families.

References

Sources
  Zsoldos, Attila (2011). Magyarország világi archontológiája, 1000–1301 ("Secular Archontology of Hungary, 1000–1301"). História, MTA Történettudományi Intézete. Budapest. 

Baldwin II
13th-century Hungarian people